Andrew William Young is a British cognitive neuropsychologist whose primary research has been on face perception.

Career
Young obtained a BSc (Psychology) from Bedford College, London in 1971 followed by a PhD from the University of Warwick in 1974.
He initially worked as a Lecturer at the University of Aberdeen (1974-1976) and at the University of Lancaster (1976-1989). He then moved to the University of Durham as Professor (1989-1993) followed by four years at the MRC Applied Psychology Unit at the University of Cambridge. In 1997 he was appointed Professor of Neuropsychology at the University of York.

Research
He has conducted research on aspects of face perception.  This has included functional neuroimaging and studies of people with different types of brain injury and psychiatric conditions.

He has discussed his work at different forums.

He has been President of the Experimental Psychology Society and the Psychology Section of the British Association for the Advancement of Science.

Awards

 1995 – Presidents Award, British Psychological Society
 2000 – Honorary doctorate, University of Liège
 2001 – Fellow, British Academy
 2004 – Academician/Fellow, Academy of Social Sciences
 2005 – Honorary Fellow, British Psychological Society
 2013 - Lifetime Achievement Award, British Psychological Society, (for Distinguished Contributions to Psychological Knowledge)

Books
 Young, A. (2016). Facial Expression Recognition: The Selected Works of Andy Young (World Library of Psychologists).
 Bruce, V., & Young, A. (2011). Face Perception.

References

Academics of the University of York
Cognitive psychologists
British psychologists
Fellows of the British Academy
Alumni of Bedford College, London
Year of birth missing (living people)
Living people